Cristina Rodríguez (born January 1, 1972) is a Spanish historian and novelist who writes in the French language. A historian specialising in the Early Roman Empire, a biographer of Caligula and Nero, she is best known for her historical novels and numerous articles on numismatics.

Rodríguez has also published hundreds of short stories and fanfics on the Internet.

Works 
Rodríguez has published works in her own name and under pseudonyms.

As Cristina Rodríguez 
 Mon Père, je m'accuse d'être banquière (ou ce que votre banquier ne vous dira jamais), Disjoncteur, collection « Top secret », 1999 .
 Les Mémoires de Caligula, Jean-Claude Lattès, 2000 .
 Moi, Sporus, prêtre et putain, Calmann Lévy, 2001 ; Sporus, priest of Nero. 
 Le César aux pieds nus, Flammarion, 2002 .
 Thyia de Sparte, Flammarion, 2004 .
 Les Enquêtes de Kaeso le prétorien :
 t. 1, Les Mystères de Pompéi, du Masque, collection « Labyrinthes », 2008 .
 t. 2, Meurtres sur le Palatin, du Masque, collection « Grands formats », 2010 .
 t. 3, L'Aphrodite profanée, du Masque, collection « Grands formats », 2011 .
 Le baiser du banni, Pré aux Clecs, 2012 .

As Claude Neix 
 Un ange est tombé, Gaies et Lesbiennes, France, 2001 ; re-edition Studio Gothika, 2010
 Cœur de démon, Gaies et Lesbiennes, France, 2003 .
 L'Elfe rouge, H&O, France, 2011 .

As Tina Kent 
 Access denied, Flammarion, collection "black Flammarion," 2002 .

As Frédéric Neuwald 
 Les Feux d'Héphaïstos (Fires of Hephaestus):
 t. 1, L'ombre d'Alexandre, Flammarion, 2004 .
 t. 2, Le tombeau d'Anubis, Flammarion, 2005 .

External links 
 Site Surveys around the praetorian Kaeso

References 

1972 births
Living people
Historians of ancient Rome
Women classical scholars
Spanish historical novelists
Spanish biographers
Spanish numismatists
Spanish women writers
Spanish writers in French
Women biographers
Women historical novelists
Women numismatists